"My Last Breath" is a song by James Newman, the United Kingdom's Eurovision entry for 2020.

My Last Breath may also refer to:

My Last Breath, 1994 English title of autobiography of Luis Buñuel Mon Dernier Soupir, also published as My Last Sigh
"My Last Breath", song by Evanescence from album Fallen
"My Last Breath", single by Battery
"My Last Breath", song by Nyles Lannon